The men's triple jump at the 2013 World Championships in Athletics was held at the Luzhniki Stadium on 16–18 August.

Qualifying three triple jumpers to the final, including top qualifier Teddy Tamgho, the No. 3 jumper of all time coming back from injury, No. 2 qualifier Yoann Rapinier and Gaëtan Saku Bafuanga Baya who squeaked in on a tie breaker, France looks to be the new triple jump power.

The first round revealed what would be the final order of finish for the first four jumpers, but not the final distances. Tamgho's first round jump of  took the lead. Will Claye bounced his best jump in the third round, . With two more rounds, would it be enough? Pichardo's  in the fifth round was long but meaningless. In the final round, defending champion and reigning Olympic champion Christian Taylor made his best effort to get on the medal stand, but  was only good enough for fourth place. With Pichardo holding the last attempt, Tamgho had to make sure. His  world leader and personal best left no doubt. It increased his standing as the third best performer ever and moved him up as the third member of the 18-meter club. Pichardo's  couldn't compete with that.

Records
Prior to the competition, the records were as follows:

Qualification standards

Schedule

Results

Qualification
Qualification: Qualifying Performance 17.05 (Q) or at least 12 best performers (q) advanced to the final.

Final
The final was started at 16:45.

References

External links
Triple jump results at IAAF website

Triple jump
Triple jump at the World Athletics Championships